Griffith Lloyd (died 1586) was Principal of Jesus College, Oxford, from 1572 to 1586. He was also Regius Professor of Civil Law from 1577 to his death.

He was originally from Lampeter, Wales where the Lloyds of Maesyfelin were a well-respected family. He was one of the first benefactors to leave land to the college, with his bequest of some land in Cardiganshire taking effect after his widow's death in 1615.

References

People from Ceredigion
Year of birth missing
1586 deaths
Principals of Jesus College, Oxford
Regius Professors of Civil Law (University of Oxford)
Welsh lawyers
Welsh educators
16th-century Welsh writers
16th-century English educators
People from Lampeter